Ruth Shoer Rappaport (née Shoer; April 22, 1937 – April 28, 2020) was an American scientist and vaccine researcher.

Early life and education 
Ruth Shoer was born on April 22, 1937 to Jennie (Pearl) Shoer and Irving Shoer. She grew up in Peabody, Massachusetts.

She graduated from Peabody High School. Along with her twin sister, Shoer graduated from Vassar College in 1959. She continued her studies at Yale University and earned her Ph.D. in 1967.

Career 
Ruth Shoer Rappaport was the first woman hired as a scientist at Wyeth Laboratories. She worked at Wyeth for four decades and rose to become the senior director of clinical immunology and virology at the company. Her research contributed to the development of vaccines for several diseases such as influenza, HIV, human rotavirus, adenovirus, E. coli, and cholera. Throughout her career, Shoer Rappaport authored dozens of scientific papers.

Personal life 
Shoer Rappaport had two sisters, Patricia Goldman-Rakic, her identical twin, and Linda Faith Schoer. Shoer Rappaport was Jewish.

Death 
Ruth Shoer Rappaport died on April 28, 2020 in Philadelphia, Pennsylvania. She was 83 years old. She is buried at Maple Hill Cemetery in Peabody.

Shoer Rappaport bequeathed $1 million to her alma mater Peabody Veterans Memorial High School.

References 

1937 births
2020 deaths
American immunologists
Women immunologists